Göycəli (also, Gëydzhali and Geydzhally) is a village and municipality in the Agstafa Rayon of Azerbaijan.  It has a population of 2,354.

References 

Populated places in Aghstafa District